The Thirty-sixth Oklahoma Legislature was a meeting of the legislative branch of the government of Oklahoma, composed of the Senate and the House of Representatives. State legislators met at the Oklahoma State Capitol in session from January 4 to June 8, 1977, from June 13 to June 17, 1977, and from January 3 to March 28, 1978, during the term of Governor David L. Boren.

Lieutenant Governor George Nigh served as President of the Senate. Gene C. Howard served as President pro tempore of the Oklahoma Senate and William Willis served as Speaker of the Oklahoma House of Representatives.

The 1978 session was marked by a student protest over rumors that state legislators were planning to close Langston University.

Dates of sessions
Organizational day: January 4, 1977
First regular session: January 4-June 8, 1977
Special session: June 13–17, 1977
Second regular session: January 3-March 28, 1978
Previous: 35th Legislature • Next: 37th Legislature

Major events
On March 1, 1978, student protesters upset with rumors that the state legislature would attempt to close Langston University broke past security in the Oklahoma State Capitol and trapped state legislators in the building. Although, the state legislators eventually escaped, the university was not close and received additional funding.

Party composition

Senate

House of Representatives

Leadership

Democratic
President Pro Tempore: Gene C. Howard
Speaker: William Willis
Speaker Pro Tempore: Spencer Bernard

Republican
Minority leader of the Senate: 
Minority leader of the House: Kent Frates

Members

Senate

Table based on 2005 state almanac.

House of Representatives

Table based on database.

References

Oklahoma legislative sessions
1977 in Oklahoma
1978 in Oklahoma
1977 U.S. legislative sessions
1978 U.S. legislative sessions